"Breakthrough" is the debut single by Japanese singer and voice actress Aya Hirano. It was first released in Japan on March 8, 2006 by the record label Lantis. "Breakthrough" and "Ichiban Boshi" were the opening and ending themes of the Japanese PlayStation 2 visual novel Finalist, respectively.

Track listing
"Breakthrough"

"Breakthrough" (off vocal)

References
Amazon.co.jp 

2006 songs
Aya Hirano songs
2006 debut singles
Lantis (company) singles